Aletty  is a village in the southern state of Karnataka, India. It is located in the Sullia taluk of Dakshina Kannada district in Karnataka.

Demographics
  India census, Aletty had a population of 7,929 with 3,988 males and 3,941 females.
 Aletty Population Census 2011

Small village
Kunchadka.
Kudekallu.
Kolchar.
Konigaje.
Narkodu.
Arambooru.
Balebolpu
Kudekallu
Morngallu
Mittadka
Nagapattana
Baddaka

See also
 Mangalore
 Dakshina Kannada
 Districts of Karnataka

References

External links
 http://dk.nic.in/

Villages in Dakshina Kannada district